The 1973–74 Marquette Warriors men's basketball team represented Marquette University in NCAA Division I men's competition in the 1973–74 academic year.

At that time, Marquette was an independent school not aligned with any conference; it did not join a conference until 1988, when it joined the Midwestern Collegiate Conference, now known as the Horizon League; it would later move to the Great Midwest Conference and Conference USA before joining its current conference, the Big East, in 2005. Also, Marquette did not adopt its current nickname of "Golden Eagles" until 1994.

Roster

NCAA basketball tournament
Mideast
Marquette 85, Ohio 59
Marquette 69, Vanderbilt 61
Marquette 72, Michigan 70
Final Four
Marquette 64, Kansas 51
North Carolina State 76, Marquette 64

Awards and honors

Team players drafted into the NBA

References

Marquette
Marquette Golden Eagles men's basketball seasons
NCAA Division I men's basketball tournament Final Four seasons
Marquette Warriors men's basketball
Marquette Warriors men's basketball
Marquette